The 2014 Chinese Artistic Gymnastics Championships were held from 8 May to 12 May 2014 in Nanning.

Women's event medal winners

Women's Team Final

Women's All-Around Final

Women's Vault Final

Women's Uneven Bars Final

Women's Balance Beam Final

Women's Floor Exercise Final

External links
  Result site

Chinese Artistic Gymnastics Championships
Artistic Gymnastics Championships
Chinese Artistic Gymnastics Championships
Chinese Artistic Gymnastics Championships